David Wayne Allvin (born ) is a United States Air Force four-star general who currently serves as the 40th vice chief of staff of the Air Force. He previously served as the director for strategy, plans, and policy, J-5, on the Joint Staff, and is a senior member, United States Delegation to the United Nations Military Staff Committee, the Pentagon, Arlington, Virginia. He provided strategic direction, policy guidance and planning focus to develop and execute the National Military Strategy. As the director for strategy, plans, and policy, he enables the chairman of the Joint Chiefs of Staff to provide military advice to the president, the secretary of defense, and the National Security Council. He has assumed the office of vice chief of staff on November 16, 2020.

Military career
Allvin graduated from the United States Air Force Academy in 1986. He has commanded at the squadron and wing levels, including the 97th Air Mobility Wing, Altus Air Force Base, Oklahoma. He has held major command staff assignments and served on the Joint Staff.

Allvin served as the commanding general of NATO Air Training Command – Afghanistan; commander of 438th Air Expeditionary Wing, Kabul, Afghanistan; commander of 618th Air and Space Operations Center; director of strategy, concepts and assessments; deputy chief of staff for strategic plans and requirements, Headquarters, U.S. Air Force, and director, strategy, plans and policy, Headquarters United States European Command, Stuttgart-Vaihingen, Germany. He most recently served as vice director of strategy, plans and policy, the Joint Staff.

In August 2020, Allvin was nominated for promotion to general and assignment as the next Vice Chief of Staff of the United States Air Force. The Senate Armed Services Committee confirmed his nomination on September 30, 2020.

Education
 1986 Bachelor of Science, astronautical engineering, U.S. Air Force Academy, Colorado Springs, Colorado
 1989 Master of Science, management, Troy State University, Troy, Alabama
 1992 Distinguished Graduate, Squadron Officer School, Maxwell Air Force Base, Alabama
 1998 Distinguished Graduate, Air Command and Staff College, Maxwell AFB, Alabama
 1999 Master of Airpower Art and Science, School of Advanced Airpower Studies, Maxwell AFB, Alabama
 2000 Air War College, Maxwell AFB, Ala., by correspondence
 2004 Distinguished Graduate, Master of Science, national security strategy, National War College, Fort Lesley J. McNair, Washington, D.C.
 2006 Executive Leadership Seminar, Smeal Business College, Pennsylvania State University, College Park
 2008 Program for Senior Managers in National Security, The George Washington University, Washington, D.C.
 2008 Air Force Enterprise Leadership Seminar, University of North Carolina, Chapel Hill
 2009 Program for Senior Executive Fellows, John F. Kennedy School of Government, Harvard University, Cambridge, Massachusetts
 2010 Fellow, Council on Foreign Relations, New York, N.Y.
 2013 Combined Force Air Component Commander Course, Maxwell AFB, Alabama
 2014 Joint Flag Officer Warfighting Course, Maxwell AFB, Alabama
 2020 Leadership at the Peak, Center for Creative Leadership, Colorado Springs, Colorado

Assignments
 June 1986 – August 1987, student, Undergraduate Pilot Training, 82nd Student Squadron, Williams Air Force Base, Arizona
 November 1987 – August 1990, C-12F copilot, aircraft commander, instructor pilot and flight examiner, 58th Military Airlift Squadron, Ramstein Air Base, Germany
 August 1990 – June 1993, C-141B copilot, aircraft commander, instructor pilot and flight examiner, 36th Military Airlift Squadron, McChord AFB, Washington
 June 1993 – June 1994, student, U.S. Air Force Test Pilot School, Edwards AFB, California
 June 1994 – July 1997, C-17 Globemaster III and C-130J Super Hercules Experimental Test Pilot, Flight Commander, Flight Examiner and Assistant Operations Officer, 418th Flight Test Squadron, Edwards AFB, California
 August 1997 – June 1998, student, Air Command and Staff College, Maxwell AFB, Alabama
 July 1998 – June 1999, student, School of Advanced Airpower Studies, Maxwell AFB, Alabama
 June 1999 – April 2001, assistant chief of Commander's Action Group, Headquarters Air Mobility Command, Scott AFB, Illinois
 April 2001 – June 2003, commander of 905th Air Refueling Squadron, Grand Forks AFB, North Dakota
 June 2003 – June 2004, student, National War College, Fort Lesley J. McNair, Washington, D.C.
 June 2004 – June 2005, chief of Organizational Policy Branch, Policy Division, Joint Staff, the Pentagon, Arlington, Virginia
 June 2005 – April 2006, special assistant to the director, Joint Staff, the Pentagon, Arlington, Virginia
 May 2006 – July 2007, vice commander of 12th Flying Training Wing, Randolph AFB, Texas
 August 2007 – July 2009, commander of 97th Air Mobility Wing, Altus AFB, Oklahoma
 August 2009 – August 2010, Senior Air Force Fellow, Council on Foreign Relations, New York, N.Y.
 September 2010 – August 2011, commanding general, NATO Air Training Command – Afghanistan, NATO Training Mission-Afghanistan/Combined Security Transition Command-Afghanistan, and commander of 438th Air Expeditionary Wing, Kabul, Afghanistan
 September 2011 – April 2012, vice commander, 618th Tanker Airlift Control Center, Scott AFB, Illinois
 April 2012 – June 2013, commander of 618th Air and Space Operations Center (Tanker Airlift Control Center), Scott AFB, Illinois
 June 2013 – September 2014, director for Air Force strategic planning, Deputy Chief of Staff for Strategic Plans and Programs, Headquarters U.S. Air Force, the Pentagon, Arlington, Virginia
 October 2014 – August 2015, director for strategy, concepts, and assessments, Deputy Chief of Staff for Strategic Plans and Requirements, Headquarters U.S. Air Force, the Pentagon, Arlington, Virginia
 August 2015 July 2018, director for strategy and policy, Headquarters U.S. European Command, Stuttgart-Vaihingen, Germany
 August 2018 – January 2019, vice director of strategy, plans, and policy (J-5), Joint Staff, the Pentagon, Arlington, Virginia
 January 2019 – November 2020, director for strategy, plans, and policy, J-5, Joint Staff; and senior member, United States Delegation to the United Nations Military Staff Committee, the Pentagon, Arlington, Virginia
 November 2020 – present, Vice Chief of Staff of the U.S. Air Force, Washington, D.C.

Summary of joint assignments
 June 2004 – June 2005, chief of Organizational Policy Branch, Policy Division, Joint Staff, the Pentagon, Arlington, Va., as a lieutenant colonel then June 2005 – April 2006, special assistant to the director, Joint Staff, the Pentagon, Arlington, Va., as a colonel
 September 2010 – August 2011, commanding general, NATO Air Training Command – Afghanistan, NATO Training Mission-Afghanistan/Combined Security Transition Command-Afghanistan, and commander of 438th Air Expeditionary Wing, Kabul, Afghanistan, as a brigadier general
 August 2015 – July 2018, director for strategy and policy, Headquarters U.S. European Command, Stuttgart-Vaihingen, Germany
 August 2018 – January 2019, vice director for strategy, plans, and policy (J-5), Joint Staff, the Pentagon, Arlington, Virginia
 January 2019 – November 2020, director for strategy, plans, and policy, J-5, Joint Staff; and senior member, United States Delegation to the United Nations Military Staff Committee, the Pentagon, Arlington, Virginia, as a lieutenant general

Flight information
Rating: Command pilot
Flight hours: More than 4,600 (including 800 flight test hours)
Aircraft flown: C-12F, C-141A/B, KC-135R/T, C-17, C-130, C-130J, C-23, F-15, F-16, T-38 and about 20 more.

Awards and decorations

Publications
"Paradigm Lost: Rethinking Theater Airlift to Support the Army After Next", Cadre Papers, Sept. 9, 2000

Dates of promotion

References

1963 births
20th-century births
Living people
United States Air Force Academy alumni
Troy University alumni
School of Advanced Air and Space Studies alumni
National War College alumni
United States Air Force generals
Recipients of the Defense Distinguished Service Medal
Recipients of the Air Force Distinguished Service Medal
Recipients of the Defense Superior Service Medal
Recipients of the Legion of Merit